Academy of Painting, also known as the School of Fine Arts of Santiago ( de Santiago), was a Chilean art school, founded on March 17, 1849 in Santiago, Chile. The school produced many works for the Chilean National Museum of Fine Arts, where it once was located.  In 1932, it merged with and is now known as the Department of Visual Arts within the Arts Faculty, University of Chile.

History 
The creation of the Academy of Painting was part of the educational plan of President Manuel Bulnes. The academy was originally located in the building belonging to the San Felipe University, in what is today the Municipal Theatre of Santiago. The school name changed to Escuela de Bellas Artes from 1891 until 1932. Various changes led the academy to merge with the Chilean National Museum of Fine Arts in 1910, and then later to hand its administration over to the University of Chile in 1932.  

The Academy of Painting would produce the country of Chile's first national artists. Despite the significance of the academy, some art historians criticized the early period (1849 to 1915) as one of the dullest in the history of Chilean art and have based their criticism on first Director Alejandro Ciccarelli's attempt to copy the European model of teaching art.

Notable people 

It would be the starting point for some of the most prominent Chilean painters, including the four great masters of Chilean painting, Pedro Lira, Juan Francisco González, Alfredo Valenzuela Puelma, and Alberto Valenzuela Llanos; their pupils; and also the future “Generación del 13” (13 Generation) painting collective. Notable academy students included Antonio Smith, Elisa Berroeta, Cosme San Martín, Onofre Jarpa, and Manuel Antonio Caro.

Directors 
The academy's early Directors were Europeans, the Neapolitan artist Alejandro Ciccarelli; the German artist Ernst Kirchbach; and the Florentine Giovanni "Juan" Mochi. The first Chilean to hold the Director position was Cosme San Martín. 

 Alejandro Ciccarelli (1849 to 1869)
 Ernst Kirchbach (1869 to 1875)
 Juan Mochi (1876 to 1881)
 Cosme San Martin (1881 to 1893)
 Pedro Lira (1893 to 1900)
 Virginio Arias (1900 to 1911)
 Fernando Alvarez de Sotomayor (1911 to 1915)

See also 

 Chilean art

References 

Academy of Painting (Santiago, Chile)
Defunct schools in Chile
Educational institutions established in 1849
Educational institutions disestablished in 1932